Many institutions of higher education in the United States maintain financial endowments, which are sums of money that are invested in stocks and yield returns that fund a portion of an institution's operational expenses and help ensure it survives in perpetuity.

U.S. colleges and universities maintain some of the largest endowments in the world, and make up the strong majority of educational institutions with endowments greater than $1 billion.

The National Association of College and University Business Officers (NACUBO) maintains information on college endowments. In 2005, the endowment table totaled $219.37 billion. By 2015, the table totaled $394.96 billion, an increase of 80%, and in 2018, the total further increased to $479.23 billion. , the total stood at $854.11 billion, with an average across all institutions of $1.1621 billion and median of $2.0102 million.

During the fiscal year 2020-21, robust returns contributed to a significant increase in the value of the largest university endowments. The four most substantial private endowments — those of Harvard, Yale, Stanford, and Princeton — increased in value from $127.24 billion to $171 billion within a single year.

Enhancements and levies
The tabulated data below are from NACUBO. Some universities benefit from endowments that are not under their direct control but which are nonetheless dedicated to the welfare of one or several institutions. Examples include The Duke Endowment, the Robert A. Welch Foundation, and the Roy J. Carver Charitable Trust.

In 2017, a federal endowment tax was enacted in the Tax Cuts and Jobs Act of 2017 in the form of an excise tax of 1.4% on institutions that have at least 500 tuition-paying students and net assets of at least $500,000 per student. The $500,000 is not adjusted for inflation, so the threshold is effectively lowered over time.

The endowment tax provision of the Tax Cuts and Jobs Act has been criticized as funding tax breaks for corporations and the wealthy at the expense of education. Critics note that the tax could threaten financial aid for low-income students, stifle social mobility, and obstruct life-saving research. There continue to be vigorous efforts that advocate the repeal of the tax. Repeal legislation with bipartisan cosponsorship was introduced, but not passed, by both the 115th United States Congress and 116th United States Congress.

Endowments greater than $1 billion

Private schools

Public schools

For public universities, the larger endowments are often associated with flagship state universities, especially those associated with a medical school.  Notably, 17 states do not have institutions included in this list: Alaska, Connecticut, Hawaii, Idaho, Maine, Mississippi, Montana, Nevada, New Hampshire, New Mexico, North Dakota, Rhode Island, South Carolina, South Dakota, Vermont, West Virginia, and Wyoming. The New England states, however, are known for their wealthy private institutions.

Endowments per student greater than $1 million

These institutions are exclusively private.
{| class="wikitable sortable"
! Institution
! Enrollment
! Endowment per student (2022, student population over 1000)
|-
|Princeton University
| 8,799
| $4,067,983
|-
|Yale University
| 14,429
| $2,868,064
|-
|Stanford University
| 16,963
| $2,139,951
|-
|Massachusetts Institute of Technology
| 11,836
| $2,090,221
|-
|Harvard University
| 24,555
| $2,013,622
|-
|Amherst College
| 1,971
| $1,685,364
|-
|Swarthmore College
| 1,651
| $1,650,658
|-
|Williams College
| 2,198
| $1,607,993
|-
|Pomona College
| 1,759
| $1,563.311
|-
|California Institute of Technology
| 2,397
| $1,516,478
|-
|Grinnell College
|1,728
| $1,437,742
|-
|University of Notre Dame
| 12,946
| $1,292,236
|-
|Bowdoin College	 
|1,949 
|$1,269,647
|-
|Wellesley College
|2,379
|$1,196,665
|-
|Dartmouth College
|6,761
|$1,192,981 					
|-
|Rice University
|7,282
|$1,107,012
|}

See also
 Lists of institutions of higher education by endowment size

References

Endowment
Financial endowments
Education finance in the United States
United States